Francisco Caldeira Cabral GCIH • GOIP (Lisboa, 26 October 1908 – Coimbra, 10 November 1992) was a Portuguese landscape architect . He was an active and internationally reputed landscape architect from the 1940s to the 1980s. He was a pioneer in the practice, study and teaching of Landscape Architecture, and he was a pioneer of the Portuguese environmental movement.

Family 

Son of António Caldeira Cabral and his wife Alice Monteiro. Born in Lisbon, Campo de Sant’Ana, nº 46, Freguesia da Pena, 26 October 1908. Married Alfreda Ferreira da Fonseca (30 June 1909 – 14 January 2001) with whom he had nine children, including Francisco Manuel Caldeira Cabral (landscape architect) and Pedro Caldeira Cabral (musician).

Biography 

Francisco Caldeira Cabral studied in Colégio Vasco da Gama, Sintra, and in the Colégio dos Jesuítas de La Guardia (Jesuit School of La Guardia) in Galiza, having finished his high-school studies in 1925. He then decided to study chemistry at Berlin-Charlottenburg Technical University, Germany, requesting some years later a transfer to electric engineering. However, pneumonia forced him to return to Portugal and, between 1931 and 1936, he studied agronomy at the Instituto Superior de Agronomia (ISA, High Institute of Agronomy), Lisbon. After graduating, he returned to Berlin, with a scholarship from Instituto de Alta Cultura and joined the landscape architecture course at Friedrich-Wilhelm University, under Professor Heinrich Friedrich Wiepking-Jürgensmann, and obtained the gardener diploma, in 1939.

He started teaching in 1940 at the Instituto Superior de Agronomia da Universidade Técnica de Lisboa on "Desenho Organográfico" (Drawing) and "Construções Rurais" (Rural Building). Shortly after that, he proposed an open-course on landscape architecture at the ISA – which was accepted. The course was optional and of free access and he started lecturing in 1941. Among his first students were landscape architects Gonçalves Ribeiro Telles and Antonio Viana Barreto who later made important contributions in several areas, including landscape planning and architecture.

In 1965 he was awarded the prize Fritz Schumaker for Landscape Planning. Between 1979 and 1986 he was a guest professor and lecturer at Evora University. During 1956 and 1986 he lectured as a guest at several universities, namely Hannover University (Germany, 1951), Berkeley University (Califórnia, 1962), Georgia University (USA, 1962), Newcastle University (England, 1968), Michigan University (USA, 1968), Escuela Superior de Arquitectura de Madrid (Spain, 1970), Escuela Superior de Ingenieros de Montes (Spain, 1971), Pennsylvania University (USA, 1972) and Instituto Agronomico Mediterraneo (Spain, 1979–1986).

He was president of IFLA (International Federation of Landscape Architects) and a founding member of Liga para a Protecção da Natureza (1948) having been its second president in 1951–52. He also presided over the Nature Conservation Section of the Lisbon Geographic Society [Sociedade de Geografia de Lisboa] in 1956, and proposed in 1963, the creation of a Portuguese Natural Parks and Natural Reserves system. This was in line with his concept of "Continuum Naturale"

He received Portugal honorific titles of "Grande-Oficial da Ordem da Instrução Pública" (6 July 1982) and "Grã-Cruz da Ordem do Infante D. Henrique" (18 March 1989)

In his honour the Centro de Estudos de Arquitectura Paisagista – Prof. Francisco Caldeira Cabral (Study Center on Landscape Architecture) was created in 2002, and in 2008, on the centenary of his birth, his name was given to a garden in Teleheiras, (Lisbon) and to the Francisco Caldeira Cabral Park, in Algés (Oeiras).

Continuum Naturale
In line with its relationship in regard to man and nature he conceived the "Continuum Naturale" concept.

Works

1940's

1940: Garden of house of Carneiro Pacheco, Estoril
1941: Quinta da Aldeia, in Estação Agronómica Nacional
1941–1945: Santa Catarina Park, Funchal, Madeira
1942: Renovation of Praça Municipio, Funchal, Madeira 
1942: Avenida do Mar, Funchal, Madeira
1942: São Francisco Garden, Funchal, Madeira
1942: Auditorium of Estação Agronómica Nacional
1943: Garden of Dr. Carlos Mantero, Cascais
1945 -1950: Gardens and Farm house of Quinta da Agrela
1947–1960: House and gardens of Quinta das Vidigueiras, em Reguengos de Monsaraz
1947–1963: Arranjos exteriores da Barragem de Belver

1950

1954: Garden Constatino Palha, Vila Franca de Xira
1957: Landscape planning and gardens of Quinta Patino, Alcoitão (Estoril)
1958: Gardens of Quinta dos Aciprestes, Linda-a-Velha (Oeiras)
1959: Quinta da Ribafria gardens, Sintra

1960

1962: Gardens of Quinta das Laranjeiras, Lisbon
1962: Gardens of Termas de Caldelas
1962: Gardens of Escola Alemã, em Lisboa (em colaboração com o Arquitecto Paisagista Gonçalo Ribeiro Telles
1963: "Jardim de Portugal", Parque Planten und Blumen, Hamburg (Germany)
1964: "Jardim de Portugal", Tokyo
1965: Landscape planning and gardens of Quinta dos Pesos, Caparide
1966: Gardens of Quinta das Lágrimas, Coimbra

1970

1981: Expansion of D. Carlos I Park, Caldas da Rainha
1981-1982: University of Aveiro Master Plan
1986–1987: Renovation and adaptation of the gardens of house Primo Madeira for Universidade do Porto

Landscape studies

1938–1940: Estádio Nacional do Jamor

Books

Articles

Presentations in conferences

References 

§1.proffranciscocaldeiracabral.portaldojardim.com/
§2. Prof. Francisco Caldeira Cabral 1908 – 1992 (PDF) (em português) Câmara Municipal de Lisboa. Visitado em 23 de Janeiro de 2012.
§3. http://www.ordens.presidencia.pt/
§4. Secção Autónoma de Arquitectura Paisagista (em português) Instituto Superior de Agronomia. Visitado em 23 de Janeiro de 2012.
§5. Forte de Sacavém acolhe espólio de arquitectos paisagistas pioneiros Jornal Público (2006 janeiro 20). Visitado em 2008 outubro 15.
§6. Gabriela M. S. Braz Lopes, Francisco Caldeira Cabral – 1º Arquitecto paisagista Português,UE, 1998
§7. Teresa Andresen, Francisco Caldeira Cabral, LDT (Landscape Design Trust) monographs, Reigate, 2001, 215 pp
§8. Teresa Andresen (Comissária), Do Estádio Nacional ao Jardim Gulbenkian. Francisco Caldeira Cabral e a primeira geração de arquitectos paisagistas (1940–1970). *Catálogo da exposição que decorreu na Fundação Calouste Gulbenkian entre 2 de Outubro de 2003 e 21 de Janeiro de 2004. Lisboa: FCG, 2003.
§9. APAP (Associação Portuguesa de Arquitectos Paisagistas) "Francisco Caldeira Cabral – memórias do mestre no centenário do seu nascimento", 2008
§10. "Prof. Francisco Caldeira Cabral – O homem e a obra, 1908 – 1992", Câmara Municipal de Gouveia, 2009
§11. Mariana Abranches Pinto, "O O legado escrito de Francisco Caldeira Cabral – Construção do pensamento teórico em arquitetura paisagista", tese apresentada para o grau de Mestre em Arquitectura Paisagista, Universidade do Porto, 2014
§12. Francisco Caldeira Cabral, LDT monographs Nº 3, Surrey, UK

1908 births
1992 deaths
Portuguese environmentalists